Morgan Evans may refer to:
Cowboy Morgan Evans (1903–1969), American rodeo performer
John M. Evans (1863–1946), American politician
Morgan "Bill" Evans (1910–2002), American landscape designer
Morgan Evans (rugby league) (born 1992), Welsh rugby league player
John Morgan Evans (1942–1991), American actor, playwright
Morgan Evans (singer), Australian country singer
Morgan Evans (album), 2014
Morgan Evans (EP), 2018